Vincent Irwin "Sandy" Nava (April 12, 1850 – June 15, 1906) was an American 19th century Major League Baseball player for five seasons from  through . Of Mexican heritage, Nava is the first known American-born Hispanic baseball player in the major leagues, and the second of Hispanic descent, behind Cuban-born Steve Bellán.

Career
Born as Vincent Irwin in San Francisco, California, Sandy made his Major League debut for the 1882 Providence Grays as a catcher.  He was brought in to be fellow San Francisco native Charlie Sweeney's catcher.  Nava's history in professional baseball showed two sides; when he was growing up in San Francisco, he apparently tried to hide his Mexican heritage and went by names like Irwin Sandy or Vincent Irwin, but when he came to the East Coast, he returned to his name of Nava and the Providence team tried to promote his "Spanish" heritage.

He played in 28 games his rookie season, and batted .206, while scoring 15 runs.  He returned to the Grays for two more seasons, continuing to be the back-up catcher to Barney Gilligan, having his best year in  when he batted .240 and scored 18 runs in 29 games. Even though he didn't hit well, he stayed on as Sweeney's personal catcher, until Sweeney was expelled from the team by refusing to leave a game in favor of Cyclone Miller.  The team decided to leave Nava and Miller behind on a road trip and later loaned them to a military team in Fort Monroe, Virginia.

Post-career
Nava was of Mexican descent, however, he was identified as Black, Indian, Portuguese, Spanish, and Cuban throughout his baseball career. In the 1900 United States Census, he was enumerated at 363 Davis Street in Baltimore, Maryland. He was listed as Vincent Nava, white and single, born April 1851, and working as an upholsterer, in a neighborhood with a large black population. Nava died in Baltimore at the age of 56, and is interred at Trinity Cemetery in Baltimore, a segregated cemetery.

References

External links

1850 births
1906 deaths
19th-century baseball players
American baseball players of Mexican descent
Baltimore Orioles (AA) players
Baseball players from California
Major League Baseball catchers
Oakland (minor league baseball) players
Providence Grays players
San Francisco Athletics players
San Francisco Reno players